Bernard McLaughlin (1862 – February 13, 1921) was an Irish born Major League Baseball player. He played three seasons in the majors, spaced at three year intervals, for three teams, in three leagues, at three positions.

With the Cowboys, he was an outfielder, playing in about half their games—more than any other Cowboys outfielder except Taylor Shafer.

With the Quakers, McLaughlin played primarily as a second baseman, splitting time at the position with Charlie Bastian and Charlie Ferguson (who was also one of the Quakers' starting pitchers).

This time, he was playing shortstop for the Syracuse Stars of the American Association in their only major league season. McLaughlin's double-play partner with the 7th-place Stars was 22-year-old rookie Cupid Childs, who would go on to a fine career. For McLaughlin, however, it was the end of the road.

McLaughlin's brother, Frank McLaughlin, was also a major league player. The two were teammates on the Cowboys, with Frank ending his career as Barney was starting his.

Sources

Major League Baseball infielders
Kansas City Cowboys (UA) players
Philadelphia Quakers players
Syracuse Stars (AA) players
Pottsville Antarcites players
Reading Actives players
Jersey City Skeeters players
Trenton Trentonians players
Waterbury Brassmen players
Charleston Quakers players
Lowell Chippies players
Syracuse Stars (minor league baseball) players
Lowell Lowells players
Major League Baseball players from Ireland
Irish baseball players
Baseball players from Massachusetts
1862 births
1921 deaths
19th-century baseball players
Irish emigrants to the United States (before 1923)